The Newcastle Falcons are a defunct basketball team that competed in Australia's National Basketball League (NBL). Based in Newcastle, New South Wales, the team played in the NBL's inaugural season in 1979 but left the league in the late 1990s after new owners based in Albury couldn't resolve the club's ongoing financial problems.

History
The Falcons hold a special place in the history of the NBL with the club largely responsible for the formation of the league which also saw them organise the first season in 1979. The other clubs had to pay a fee of around AU$300 to the Falcons to participate in that first season and the city of Newcastle is regarded as the birthplace of the NBL.

The club's original colours were green and white, being the city's colours, but the club soon changed to black and red, and to red and blue, after the Newcastle Knights' admission to the New South Wales Rugby League in 1988. All the national league clubs in Newcastle took on red and blue as their colours at some stage in their existence.

The club's downfall began in the mid-1990s when problems with sponsor, clothing and sports equipment company Topper befell them and the National Soccer League's Newcastle Breakers. Even with the support of new sponsor EnergyAustralia and new owners, the club couldn't get itself out of trouble, and left the league following the 1998–99 NBL season.

Home Arenas

After spending its first 13 seasons playing out of the 2,200 capacity Broadmeadow Basketball Stadium, the Falcons made the move to the new, 4,658 seat Newcastle Entertainment Centre located on the other side of the Newcastle Showgrounds in 1992 where they would remain until the club folded in 1999. Although the Falcons never appeared in an NBL Grand Final, the Broadmeadow Stadium hosted the 1982 NBL Grand Final between the West Adelaide Bearcats and the Geelong Supercats. West Adelaide won the Grand Final 80–74 in front of a capacity crowd.

Post 1999
The city of Newcastle had no NBL team until the new owners of the Canberra Cannons moved to Newcastle and established the Hunter Pirates in 2003. The Pirates in turn withdrew from the NBL at the end of the 2005–2006 season after their licence was sold to the Singapore Slingers.

In 2011, past Falcons players reunited for a charity exhibition game at the Broadmeadow Basketball Stadium to raise funds for the Cancer Council. Nathan Tinkler's Hunter Sports Group attempted to revive the Falcons NBL team around this time but was ultimately unsuccessful in doing so.

The Falcons name was revived in 2021 when the Newcastle Hunters Waratah League basketball team announced that they would be changing their name to the Newcastle Falcons upon their admission to the NBL1 East competition in 2022.

Honour roll

Season by season

References

External links

 
Sport in Newcastle, New South Wales
Defunct National Basketball League (Australia) teams
Basketball teams established in 1979
Basketball teams disestablished in 1999
Basketball teams in New South Wales
1979 establishments in Australia
1999 disestablishments in Australia